The Nigeria women's national cricket team represents the country of Nigeria in international women's cricket. The team is organised by the Nigeria Cricket Federation, which has been a member of the International Cricket Council (ICC) since 2002.

History
Nigeria made its international debut at the 2011 ICC Africa Women's T20 Tournament in Uganda. The team lost their first game, against Kenya, by ten wickets, but rebounded to win their next match, against Sierra Leone, by six wickets. They lost their remaining three matches (against Namibia, Tanzania, and Uganda), however, finishing fifth out of six teams overall. In August 2015 Nigeria appeared in an invitation tournament in Dar es Salaam, which featured the Tanzanian national team and a team from India's Mumbai Cricket Association.

In April 2018, the ICC granted full Women's Twenty20 International (WT20I) status to all its members. Therefore, all Twenty20 matches played between Nigeria women and another international side since 1 July 2018 have been full WT20Is. Nigeria made its Twenty20 International debut against Rwanda at Abuja on 26 January 2019. The teams played a five-game series with Nigeria winning by 3-2.

In December 2020, the ICC announced the qualification pathway for the 2023 ICC Women's T20 World Cup. Nigeria were named in the 2021 ICC Women's T20 World Cup Africa Qualifier regional group, alongside ten other teams.

Squad

This lists all the players who played for Nigeria in the past 12 months or were named in the most recent squad. Updated on 17 Jun 2022.

Records and statistics 
International Match Summary — Nigeria Women
 
Last updated 17 June 2022

Twenty20 International 

 Highest team total: 131/3 v. Sierra Leone on 28 March 2022 at Tafawa Balewa Square Cricket Oval, Lagos.
 Highest individual score: 63, Salome Sunday v. Rwanda on 2 April 2022 at Tafawa Balewa Square Cricket Oval, Lagos.
 Best individual bowling figures: 4/0, Blessing Etim v. Eswatini on 13 September 2021 at Botswana Cricket Association Oval 2, Gaborone.

Most T20I runs for Nigeria Women

Most T20I wickets for Nigeria Women

T20I record versus other nations

Records complete to WT20I #1126. Last updated 17 June 2022.

See also
 List of Nigeria women Twenty20 International cricketers

References

Cricket in Nigeria
Cricket
Women's national cricket teams
Women